Saxoncourt Group is a group of companies that operate English schools in the UK, Taiwan, China, South Korea, Vietnam, Algeria, Poland, Thailand and Turkey. Saxoncourt Holdings, Ltd., is based in Road Town, British Virgin Islands. 

The original company in the group, Shane English School, was founded in Tokyo, Japan in 1977 by Shane Lipscome. Shane English School's Japanese operations were sold off to the Japanese cram school operator Eikoh in 2010.

Group companies
 Shane Global Language Centre London
 Shane Global Language Centre Hastings
 Saxoncourt Teacher Training and Recruitment
 Saxoncourt Publishing
 Shane English School Taiwan
 Saxoncourt Beijing
 Shane English School Beijing
 Saxoncourt Guangzhou
 Shane English School Guangzhou
 Saxoncourt Shanghai
 Shane English School Shanghai
 Shane English Centre Vietnam
 Shane Language Centre Algeria
 Saxoncourt Poland
 Shane English School Thailand
 Shane English School Turkey
 Nanteos Mansion, Wales

History

Origins
Shane English School was started by Shane Lipscombe in the kitchen of his apartment in Tokyo in 1977.

Growth of the company
One of the co-companies, Saxoncourt Teacher Recruitment, was founded in 1990, and it started to place teachers in Japan. Also in 1990, Shane English School opened its 50th school. Two years later in 1992, another co-company called Shane Global Language Centre opened in London's West End. The third co-company, Saxoncourt Teacher Training, began a year later in 1993, and started training its first teachers, and established the first CELTA courses. Also in 1993, Shane English School Japan opened its 100th school, and became one of the founding members of the Japan Association for the Promotion of Foreign Language Education (JAPFLE). The following year in 1994, operations of Shane English School Taiwan were established.　In 1997, their first kindergarten opened in Taiwan. 

In 1997, The Saxoncourt Group invested in Target Co. of Poland and established Target & Shane Language Training.

References

External links
 
 Saxoncourt Facebook page

Education in the United Kingdom
Schools of English as a second or foreign language